Lindop is a surname. Notable people by that name include:

 Grevel Lindop (born 1948), English poet.
 Fred Lindop, former British rugby league referee.
 Audrey Erskine Lindop (1920–1986) English writer.
 Hubert Lindop (1907–1982), English cricketer. 
 Patricia Lindop (1930-2018), professor of radiation biology.